Posht Mesar (also Romanized as Posht Mesār; also known as Posht Mīān) is a village in Markiyeh Rural District, Mirza Kuchek Janghli District, Sowme'eh Sara County, Gilan Province, Iran. At the 2006 census, its population was 1,438, in 380 families.

References 

Populated places in Sowme'eh Sara County